There are hundreds of scout camps around the world. Some of these are historically notable Scout camps. Each Scouting association runs its own camp. For example, in the United States, a number of national camps are run by the Boy Scouts of America, and the local councils run the greatest number of camps. The two most important factors in establishing notability are the age of the camp, and its impact on the local community or country where it is located.

Oldest Boy Scout Camps of the BSA
In the United States, summer camps were an important part of 20th century culture. Many camps are notable for their impact, few are more than 80 years old. The oldest scout camp may be Owasippe Scout Reservation in Michigan.

Part of camp culture are the societies of "honor campers." (i.e. "Tribe of Owasippe," Camp Teetonkah's "Tribe of Keokuk," Camp Delmont's "Order of the Tipi," "Old Guard of Glen Gray," "Knights of Yawgoog Honor Society," "Stambaugh Tribe of Good Indians," Camp Indian Mound's  "Tribe of Ku-ni-eh," Camp Miakonda's "Tribe of Gimogash," Camp Belzer's "Firecrafters," Scouthaven's "Tribe of Wokanda," Camp Friedlander's "Tribe of Ku-ni-eh," and the "Order of the Silver Marmot" at Camp Parsons). Treasure Island was the birthplace of the Order of the Arrow in 1915.

Camp Belzer 

Originally named Camp Chank-Tun-Un-Gi,  Camp Belzer was founded in 1918 by the Central Indiana Boy Scout Council. Located near Indianapolis, Indiana. It was named after local philanthropist and the creator of the Firecrafter organization, Francis O. Belzer ("The Chief").

Camp Conewago 

Located near New Oxford, Pennsylvania,  Camp Conewago was purchased in 1919 by the officers of Conewago Council. Purchased by a local trust and independent of the BSA, the camp has an endowment to provide funds for materials for maintenance. The New Birth of Freedom Council operates the camp. Summer Camp was last held there in 1948.

Camp Delmont 

Located along the Unami Creek in Marlborough Township, Pennsylvania, Camp Delmont was created in 1916, the camp, and the adjoining Hart Scout Reservation, became part of the Musser Scout Reservation after the council merger with the Philadelphia Council. The camp name is a portmanteau of the two counties (Delaware and Montgomery) covered by the original owner, the Valley Forge Council.

Camp Friedlander 

Establisher in 1919, Camp Friedlander, is located in Loveland, Ohio and run originally by the Cincinnati Area Council and,after mergers, currently by the Dan Beard Council. It is now part of the larger Dan Beard Scout Reservation.

Camp Glen Gray 

Camp Glen Gray was located near Mahwah, New Jersey in the Ramapo Mountains in Bergen County, New Jersey. Founded in 1917 by Frank Gray for the Montclair Council, the  camp is named after Frank Gray, a well known early professional Scouter of that area. The camp is now a Bergen County Park and is independently managed and financially supported by The Friends of Glen Gray, Inc.

Indian Mound Scout Reservation

Founded in 1917 by the Milwaukee County Council, Indian Mound Scout Reservation, near Oconomowoc, Wisconsin, gets its name from the 1,000-year-old Indian mound in the middle of the camp. The mound is shaped somewhat like a lizard or turtle. The  Scout reservation has two camps on it.

Camp Miakonda 

 Camp Miakonda was founded in 1917 and is located in Sylvania, Ohio by the Toledo Council. Originally a weekend camp, it became a summer camp in 1924.

Owasippe Scout Reservation 

In 1911, the Chicago Area Council founded Camp Owasippe near Whitehall, Michigan. The reservation lies within the boundaries of Manistee National Forest. The Northwest border of the camp is formed in part by the White River.

Camp Parsons 

Camp Parsons, located on the Hood Canal near Brinnon, Washington, was founded in 1919 by the Chief Seattle Council. The  property is a former logging camp and is the oldest continuous BSA camp in the Western United States. The camp was named after the council's first president, Reginald Parsons, who purchased and donated it to the Scouts.

Scouthaven 

Located near Arcade, New York, Scouthaven was founded 1918 by the Buffalo Council. At first, the camp was named Camp Crystal, after Crystal Lake. It was renamed to Scouthaven in 1923. Early in its history, Scouts arrived on a "milk train" that passed by the camp. The  site was an amusement park in the first part of the 20th century.

Camp Stambaugh 

In 1919, Henry H. Stambaugh, upon his death, donated his  farm in Canfield, Ohio, known as Indian Creek Farm, to the Youngstown Council. The first summer camp opened on July 4, 1919, and the camp has been in continuous operation since then. With the merger of the Mahoning Valley Council, Western Reserve Council and the Northeast Ohio Councils summer camp programs at Camp Stambaugh were moved to Camp Stigwandish.

Camp Teetonkah 

In 1916, the Jackson Council established Camp Teetonkah near Jackson, Michigan. Teetonkah served as a summer camp until the mid-90s. After nine councils in the lower peninsula of michigan merged in the early 2010s, Teetonkah was evaluated and determined to take the place of Camp Rota-Kiwan and Camp Munhacke, both of which were closed in 2019.  The Michigan Crossroads Council now uses Camp Teetonkah as a Cub Scout Camp, a weekend BSA camp, and the Southern District Michigami Lodge OA camp.

Treasure Island Scout Camp 

 Treasure Island Scout Camp was founded in 1913 by the Philadelphia Council, located between Point Pleasant, Pennsylvania and Frenchtown, New Jersey. The camp closed in 2006, but has reopened under private ownership.

Camp Wakenah 

Camp Wakenah was founded on Gardner Lake near Salem, Connecticut by the Pequot Council. The camp was last used as a summer camp in 1972, and was sold by the Connecticut Rivers Council in 2004.

Yawgoog Scout Reservation 

 Yawgoog Scout Reservation was established in 1916 with land purchased by the Rhode Island Boy Scouts.  Named after a Narragansett Indian Chief, it is located near Rockville, Rhode Island.

High Adventure Programs of the BSA 

 Philmont Scout Ranch is located in Cimarron, New Mexico. It has thirty-four staffed camps and fifty-five trail camps. Its programs include horseback riding, burro packing and racing, gold panning, chuck wagon dinners, interpretive history, rock climbing, mountain biking, and rifle shooting 
 Florida National High Adventure Sea Base is located in Islamorada, Florida on the end of Lower Matecumbe Key. It focuses on Venturing and Scout High Adventure. Its programs include scuba certification, tall ship sailing, fishing, snorkeling, swimming, kayaking, and ecology activities.
 Northern Tier National High Adventure Bases is located in Ely, Minnesota. It focuses on Venturing and Scout High Adventure. Its programs include canoe trips in Minnesota, Quetico Provincial Park and the Canadian Crownlands, as well as winter skiing, snowshoe expeditions, and dog sledding.
 The Summit Bechtel Family National Scout Reserve is located near the New River Gorge National River in southern West Virginia.

Notable camps of the GSUSA

Camp Bonnie Brae 

Established in the Berkshire Mountains in 1919 by the Springfield Girl Scout Council, the  Camp Bonnie Brae is today, the oldest continuously operated camp of the GSUSA. It is located on the northeast shore of Big Pond in East Otis, Massachusetts. It is currently operated by the Girl Scouts of Central and Western Massachusetts.

Notable Scout camps of Canada

Camp Tamaracouta 

Founded in 1912 by the Quebec Council, the  Camp Tamaracouta is Canada's oldest Scout camp. Founded in 1933, the Knights of Tamara Society is the camp's honor society.

Notable Scout camps of Mexico

Meztitla Scout Camp School

Founded in 1956, the Meztitla Scout Camp School is the national Scout camp and school owned by the Asociación de Scouts de México, A.C., located in the Central Highlands of Mexico, northeast of the municipality of Tepoztlán, in the state of Morelos.

Notable Scout camps of the United Kingdom

Brownsea Island Scout camp

Brownsea Island was the site of the first boys' camping event organized by Lieutenant-General Baden-Powell to test his ideas for the book Scouting for Boys.

Gilwell Park

Gilwell Park is one of twelve national centres run directly by or in partnership with the Scout Association. It is the original home of Wood Badge training.

See also

 List of council camps (Boy Scouts of America)
 List of summer camps
 Scout Activity Centres
 World Scout Centres

Notes

References

Scout campsites